John-Blair Bickerstaff (born March 10, 1979) is an American professional basketball coach who is the head coach for the Cleveland Cavaliers of the National Basketball Association (NBA). Before that, he was the head coach for the Memphis Grizzlies and has also been an assistant coach for several other NBA teams.

College career
Bickerstaff played his first two collegiate seasons at Oregon State and finished his career at the University of Minnesota. He averaged 10.9 points and 6.1 rebounds as a senior for the Golden Gophers.

Coaching career
Bickerstaff spent three seasons (2004–2007) with the Charlotte Bobcats as an assistant coach, before spending four (2007–2011) seasons as an assistant coach for the Minnesota Timberwolves. He was hired as an assistant coach by the Rockets on July 15, 2011. He was made interim head coach of the Rockets on November 18, 2015, after Kevin McHale was fired. On that same day, he made his coaching debut against the Portland Trail Blazers with a 108–103 overtime victory.

After the season, Bickerstaff informed the Rockets that he had withdrawn his name for the head coaching search, effectively ending his tenure with the Houston Rockets.

On June 8, 2016, Bickerstaff was hired by the Memphis Grizzlies to be the associate head coach.

On November 27, 2017, Bickerstaff was promoted as the Grizzlies' interim head coach after the firing of David Fizdale. On May 1, 2018, he was announced as the new permanent head coach of the Grizzlies. On April 11, 2019, the Grizzlies fired Bickerstaff after the team failed to reach the playoffs.

On May 19, 2019, the Cleveland Cavaliers named Bickerstaff assistant and associate head coach. On February 19, 2020, head coach John Beilein resigned as head coach of the Cavaliers, and Bickerstaff was announced as the new head coach. On March 10, the Cavaliers announced that they had agreed on a multi-year contract with Bickerstaff. On December 25, 2021, the Cavaliers signed Bickerstaff to a multi-year contract extension.

Head coaching record

|-
| style="text-align:left;"|Houston
| style="text-align:left;"|
| 71 || 37 || 34 ||  || style="text-align:center;"|4th in Southwest || 5 || 1 || 4 || 
| style="text-align:center;"|Lost in First Round
|-
| style="text-align:left;"|Memphis
| style="text-align:left;"|
| 63 || 15 || 48 ||  || style="text-align:center;"|5th in Southwest || — || — || — || —
| style="text-align:center;"|Missed playoffs
|-
| style="text-align:left;"|Memphis
| style="text-align:left;"|
| 82 || 33 || 49 ||  || style="text-align:center;"|3rd in Southwest || — || — || — || —
| style="text-align:center;"|Missed playoffs
|-
| style="text-align:left;"|Cleveland
| style="text-align:left;"|
| 11 || 5 || 6 ||  || style="text-align:center;"|5th in Central || — || — || — || —
| style="text-align:center;"|Missed playoffs
|-
| style="text-align:left;"|Cleveland
| style="text-align:left;"|
| 72 || 22 || 50 ||  || style="text-align:center;"|4th in Central || — || — || — || —
| style="text-align:center;"|Missed playoffs
|-
| style="text-align:left;"|Cleveland
| style="text-align:left;"|
| 82 || 44 || 38 ||  || style="text-align:center;"|3rd in Central || — || — || — || —
| style="text-align:center;"|Missed playoffs
|- class="sortbottom"
| style="text-align:center;" colspan="2"|Career || 381 || 156 || 225 ||  ||   || 5 || 1 || 4 ||  ||

Personal life
Bickerstaff is the son of former NBA coach Bernie Bickerstaff, who is also working for the Cavaliers in their front office serving as senior basketball advisor.

References

External links
College statistics

1979 births
Living people
African-American basketball coaches
American men's basketball coaches
American men's basketball players
Basketball coaches from Colorado
Basketball players from Denver
Charlotte Bobcats assistant coaches
Cleveland Cavaliers assistant coaches
Cleveland Cavaliers head coaches
Forwards (basketball)
Houston Rockets assistant coaches
Houston Rockets head coaches
Memphis Grizzlies assistant coaches
Memphis Grizzlies head coaches
Minnesota Golden Gophers men's basketball players
Minnesota Timberwolves assistant coaches
Oregon State Beavers men's basketball players
Sportspeople from Denver